Edward Irham Cole (3 December 1859 – 1 July 1942) was an Australian theatrical entrepreneur and film director whose productions represented a synthesis of Wild West show and stage melodrama (often with a bushranger theme).  He managed a theatre company, called the Bohemian Dramatic Company, that performed in semi-permanent and temporary tent theatres.  During 1910 and 1911 Cole directed a number of silent films, adapted from his stage plays and using actors from his theatre company.

Biography

Cole arrived in Australia as a young man and worked for a time in Adelaide before moving to Wilcannia.

He started in showbusiness as a lecturer, calling himself "the Bohemian" and giving presentations on various topics.

He later joined the company of Texas Jack, an American showman in the Buffalo Bill mould. He established the Bohemian Dramatic Company, which toured the country performing shows. At its height, the company included over 60 performers and 20 horses, and was transported in its own train.

In 1910 and 1911 Cole made a series of films adapted from his shows, which cost over £1,000 in all. The longest was reportedly 1,5000 feet. They were sometimes screened accompanied by lectures and songs. Cole toured Tasmania in 1911 and 1912.

By 1926 the company was down to a size of 24 and touring mostly only country areas.

Later Years
Cole's company was still touring in the 1930s as 'Cole's Varieties', run by his son-in-law, Bill Ayr.

Cole and his wife ran a small factory at Marrickville in Sydney which manufactured cowboy outfits for small children.

Personal life
Cole married his leading lady, Vene Linden (real name Lavinia Catherine) (1877 - 1948). They had several children: Frank, Roy, Mabel, Belle, Rose and Myrtle.

Roy predeceased them. Mabel married Cole's leading man, Bill Ayr. They had three children, Ned, Tom and Millie.

In later years, Millie and Ned Ayr would be actors for the company while Tom Ayr handled most of the managerial duties of Cole's Varieties.

In 1931, Cole's wife engaged in a court case against her sister for ownership of their father's cottage.

Cole died on 1 July 1942. His wife died on 8 November 1948, aged 71, survived by their children Frank, Belle, Mabel, Rose and Myrtle; a son, Roy, had predeceased her.

Filmography
Bushranger's Ransom, or A Ride for Life (1911)
The Squatter's Son (1911)
The Five of Hearts (1911)
Sentenced for Life (1911)
The Sundowner (1911)
The Squatter and the Clown

Select theatre credits
The Indian Hero
Who is the Woman?
The Anarchist
East Lynne
Uncle Tom's Cabin
Captain Moonlite
The Gaol Bird
Cast Aside
With the Colours
Hand's Up (1900) – story of Ned Kelly
Prairie Scout (1903) – performed in the open opposite Redfern Train Station
Buffalo Bill (1904)
The King of the Road (1904) – bushranger drama about Ben Hall
Sentenced for Life (1904)
The Mining Partner (1904)
Jo the Girl Miner (1905)
The White Slave (1905) – Haymarket Hippodrome, Sydney
With the Colours – Haymarket Hippodrome, Sydney – drama set during the Second Boer War
A Priest's Silence (1905)
Golden Heart (1906)
Kia Ora (1906) – Haymarket – a four-act Maori drama
For King and Empire (1906) by E. I. Cole – about a European War of the near future
The King of the Roads (1906) – Haymarket
The Coal Strike (1906) – Haymarket – saga of labour and management
Hands Up: Or Ned Kelly and His Gang (1907) – Haymarket
Whirlwind, the Bushranger (1907) – Haymarket
Thunderbolt, the Bushranger (1908) – Haymarket – about Captain Thunderbolt
Buffalo Bill and Dick Turpin (1910)
The King of the Roads"/"Under Two Flags/The Hand of Justice (1911) – series of plays performed at Launceston
The British Spy (1911–12) – Hobart – play set during the Second Boer War
Golden Heart (1912) – a Spanish-Mexican drama
It Is Never Too Late to Mend (1912) – Hobart- play based on the convict era novel
A Convict's Sweetheart (1912)
Arrah-Na-Pogue (1912) – Irish drama
Postmistress of the Czar (1912) – Kings Theatre, Hobart – Anglo-Russian military story
The Heart of the Bush (1912) – Kings Theatre, Hobart – Australian bush story
A Woman's Honour (1913)
Dick Turpin (1914) – Hippodrome
Captain Starlight, or Robbery Under Arms (1914) – Hippodrome
The Covenant's Trust (1915)
Buffalo Bill (1919)
Meg of Golden Heart/The Octoroon (1919)
The Ruby Ring (1919)
The Kelly Gang (1920)

References

Sources

 Andrew James Couzens (2019), A Cultural History of the Bushranger Legend in Theatres and Cinemas, 1828-2017, London: Anthem Press.

External links

E. I. Cole at National Film and Sound Archive
Papers of E. I. Cole at State Library of New South Wales

1910s in Australian cinema
Australian male actors
Australian film directors
1942 deaths
1859 births